The Best Female Tennis Player ESPY Award has been presented annually since 1993 to the professional female tennis player adjudged to be the best in a given calendar year.

Between 1993 and 2004, the award voting panel comprised variously fans; sportswriters and broadcasters, sports executives, and retired sportspersons, termed collectively experts; and ESPN personalities, but balloting thereafter has been exclusively by fans over the Internet from amongst choices selected by the ESPN Select Nominating Committee.

Through the 2001 iteration of the ESPY Awards, ceremonies were conducted in February of each year to honor achievements over the previous calendar year; awards presented thereafter are conferred in June and reflect performance from the June previous. The award wasn't awarded in 2020 due to the COVID-19 pandemic.

List of winners

See also

 List of sports awards honoring women
 Best Male Tennis Player ESPY Award
 List of WTA number one-ranked players
 WTA Player of the Year Award

References

ESPY Awards
Tennis awards
Women's tennis
Sports awards honoring women
Awards established in 1993